National Parks Act 1980 may refer to:

National Parks Act 1980 (Malaysia)
National Parks Act 1980 (New Zealand)